Savenaca Rawaca, OF (born 20 August 1991) is a Fijian rugby union player. Renowned for his physicality and aggressiveness on the rugby field, he earned the nickname "Pitbull". He is currently playing for the Fiji sevens team. In August 2016, he was a part of the Fiji sevens men's rugby team that won a gold medal at the 2016 Summer Olympics in Rio de Janeiro.

Career

Rawaca was born and raised in Navatu, Bua and he started his career playing rugby in the local sevens competition. He played for the Bua sevens team and was selected by Ben Ryan to represent the Fiji national sevens side in 2014 Gold Coast Sevens.

Honours

Rawaca has been appointed an Officer of the Order of Fiji.

References

External links

 
 
 
 Savenaca Rawaca at Zimbio

Fiji international rugby union players
Fijian rugby union players
Fiji international rugby sevens players
Officers of the Order of Fiji
People from Bua Province
1991 births
Living people
Rugby union centres
Rugby union wings
Pacific Islanders rugby union players
I-Taukei Fijian people
Fijian people of I-Taukei Fijian descent
Rugby union fly-halves
Rugby union fullbacks
Male rugby sevens players
Rugby sevens players at the 2016 Summer Olympics
Olympic rugby sevens players of Fiji
Olympic gold medalists for Fiji
Olympic medalists in rugby sevens
Medalists at the 2016 Summer Olympics
Saracens F.C. players
Expatriate rugby union players in England
Fijian expatriate rugby union players
Fijian expatriate sportspeople in England
Fijian expatriate sportspeople in France
Expatriate rugby union players in France
Stade Rochelais players
AS Béziers Hérault players
Aviron Bayonnais players